Anton Valeryevich Nimenko (born 17 October 1980) is a Russian figure skating coach and former competitor. As a pair skater with Milica Brozović, he is the 1998 Nebelhorn Trophy bronze medalist and a four-time medalist on the ISU Junior Grand Prix series. They also competed at two World Junior Championships.

Career

Competitive 
Nimenko began learning to skate in 1987. Starting in 1998, he competed internationally for Russia with Milica Brozović from Yugoslavia.

Brozović/Nimenko received the bronze medal at the 1998 Nebelhorn Trophy in late August. Competing in the 1998–1999 ISU Junior Grand Prix series, they won gold in September in Mexico City, Mexico, and took silver the following month in Beijing, China. They finished fifth at the 1999 World Junior Championships, held in late November in Zagreb, Croatia; and fourth at the Junior Grand Prix Final, which took place in March in Detroit, Michigan, United States.

Competing in the 1999–2000 ISU Junior Grand Prix series, Brozović/Nimenko won silver at a September event in Zagreb and bronze at their October assignment in The Hague, Netherlands. At the 2000 Russian Championships, they finished fifth competing in the senior ranks and then took bronze at the junior event. In March, they placed seventh at the 2000 World Junior Championships in Oberstdorf, Germany.

In October 2000, Brozović/Nimenko placed fourth at the 1999–2000 ISU Junior Grand Prix in Ostrava, Czech Republic. It was their final international together. Nina Mozer coached the pair in Moscow.

Post-competitive 
Nimenko became a skating coach in New Jersey. He has coached:
 Arina Cherniavskaia / Evgeni Krasnopolski
 Paige Conners / Evgeni Krasnopolski
 Anastasia Kononenko
 Hailey Esther Kops / Artem Tsoglin
 Adel Tankova / Evgeni Krasnopolski

Programs 
(with Brozovic)

Competitive highlights
JGP: ISU Junior Grand Prix
with Brozovic

References

Russian emigrants to the United States
Russian figure skating coaches
Russian male pair skaters
Living people
1980 births
Sportspeople from Chelyabinsk